The Josiah Dennis Manse Museum  is a historic house at 61 Whig Street in Dennis, Massachusetts.  The -story timber frame saltbox house was built c. 1736 as a home for Rev. Josiah Dennis, the first minister of the East Yarmouth Parish, as the Dennis area was then known.  The Rev. Dennis was the minister for 38 years, and it is for him that the town is named.  The Dennis Historical Society owns and operates the house as the Josiah Dennis Manse Museum, an 18th-century historic house museum.  The house, located at the intersection with Nobscussett Road, is open on Tuesdays and Thursdays in the summer.  The property also includes the West Schoolhouse, the town's only surviving district school building.

The house was listed on the National Register of Historic Places in 1974.

See also
National Register of Historic Places listings in Barnstable County, Massachusetts

References

External links
Josiah Dennis House - Dennis Historical Society

Houses completed in 1736
Historic house museums in Massachusetts
Museums in Barnstable County, Massachusetts
Houses in Barnstable County, Massachusetts
Dennis, Massachusetts
National Register of Historic Places in Barnstable County, Massachusetts
Houses on the National Register of Historic Places in Barnstable County, Massachusetts